Brachyprotoma obtusata (also known as the short-faced skunk) is an extinct genus of skunk of the Pleistocene epoch what is now North America.

References

Skunks
Prehistoric caniforms
Fauna of Canada
Extinct animals of the United States
Taxa named by Edward Drinker Cope
Taxa named by Barnum Brown
Fossil taxa described in 1908
Prehistoric carnivoran genera